The Kuali Foundation is a non-profit, 501(c)(3) corporation that develops open source enterprise resource planning software for higher education institutions. Kuali modules include Student, Financial, Human Resources, Research Administration, and Library.

Founding partners are Indiana University, The University of Arizona, the University of Hawaii, Michigan State University, San Joaquin Delta Community College, Cornell University, NACUBO, and the rSmart Group.

History
Around 2003, Indiana University administrators were considering alternatives for replacing the existing financial information system. They looked at retooling the current financial system or buying vendor software. In 2004, Indiana University chief information officer Brad Wheeler wrote a paper about the state of open and community source software development in education. This paper helped coalesce a movement among higher ed institutions to create a community source enterprise resource planning software suite.

Wheeler's preliminary work assessed higher education's readiness for a community source financial system project and its applicability across colleges and universities through a planning grant from the Andrew W. Mellon Foundation to National Association of College and University Business Officers (NACUBO) in 2004. In March 2005, after more than a year of evaluation, partner coalescing, and preparatory work, the Kuali Financial System (KFS) received a $2.5 million grant from the Mellon Foundation to help complete the software development. Colorado State University and San Joaquin Delta College became the first to host large-scale installations of the full KFS in 2009. Kuali modules now include Student, Financial, Research, and a no-code forms and workflow tool called Kuali Build.

Over the next ten years, usage of Kuali had increased substantially, and by 2014 the Kuali Foundation had 74 member institutions.

In 2014, the foundation invested in Kuali, Inc., which is now responsible for the development of Kuali software and offers the software in the cloud for higher ed institutions.

See also
 History of free and open-source software

References

External links 
 
  Kuali tries to compete

Free software project foundations in the United States
Organizations established in 2005
501(c)(3) organizations
Free ERP software